Ken Hughes is an American presidential historian who works at the Miller Center of Public Affairs. He has studied the Nixon administration and is an expert on the Nixon tapes and Watergate.

Works

References

Miller Center Affiliates
21st-century American historians
21st-century American male writers
Year of birth missing (living people)
Living people
American male non-fiction writers